I Don't Wanna Leave may refer to:

 "I Don't Wanna Leave" (Lidia Kopania song), 2009
 "I Don't Wanna Leave" (Rüfüs Du Sol song), 2021